

Gmina Ogrodzieniec is an urban-rural gmina (administrative district) in Zawiercie County, Silesian Voivodeship, in southern Poland.

The gmina contains part of the protected area called Eagle Nests Landscape Park.

Villages
Apart from the town of Ogrodzieniec, Gmina Ogrodzieniec contains the villages and settlements of Fugasówka, Giebło, Giebło-Kolonia, Gulzów, Kiełkowice, Markowizna, Mokrus, Podzamcze, Ryczów, Ryczów-Kolonia, Śrubarnia and Żelazko.

Neighbouring gminas
Gmina Ogrodzieniec is bordered by the town of Zawiercie and by the gminas of Klucze, Kroczyce, Łazy and Pilica.

Twin towns – sister cities

Gmina Ogrodzieniec is twinned with:

 Bogács, Hungary
 Forbach, Germany
 Groß-Bieberau, Germany
 Melissano, Italy
 Spišské Podhradie, Slovakia
 Tuczno, Poland

References

Ogrodzieniec
Zawiercie County